Alistair Stuart Gibb (born 17 February 1976) is a former footballer, who is Senior Academy Physiotherapist at League Two club Bolton Wanderers. He joined Bath after his release from Hartlepool United in 2008. The former Norwich City player was signed by Hartlepool on transfer deadline day in August 2006.

Gibb was a versatile right sided player, who usually played on the right wing. He began his career at Norwich City before moving to Northampton Town. He then played over 150 games for Stockport County before joining Bristol Rovers in 2004. He joined Notts County on loan in January 2008.

After signing for Bath City in the summer of 2008, Gibb broke his ankle during pre-season training and was unable to play for seven months. He was loaned to Yate Town in February 2009 in order to regain match fitness.

Post-playing career
Gibb has held physiotherapist posts at Shrewsbury Town and former club Stockport. As of 2017, he is the Senior Academy Physiotherapist at Football League One club Bolton Wanderers.

Personal life
Gibb studied at the University of Salford for a degree in Physiotherapy, graduating in 2015 with first class honours and the highest marks in the part-time degree cohort.

Honours
Northampton Town
Football League Third Division play-offs: 1997

Hartlepool United
Football League Two runners-up: 2006–07

References

External links
Gibb's Official Hartlepool United F.C. profile
Vital Hartlepool Profile: Ali Gibb
Career information at ex-canaries.co.uk

1976 births
Living people
English footballers
Association football midfielders
Norwich City F.C. players
Northampton Town F.C. players
Stockport County F.C. players
Bristol Rovers F.C. players
Hartlepool United F.C. players
Notts County F.C. players
Bath City F.C. players
Yate Town F.C. players
Newport County A.F.C. players
Almondsbury Town A.F.C. players
Alumni of the University of Salford
Association football physiotherapists
English Football League players
Stockport County F.C. non-playing staff
Shrewsbury Town F.C. non-playing staff
Bolton Wanderers F.C. non-playing staff